Rudolf Oskar Robert Williams Geiger (24 August 1894 – 22 January 1981) was a German meteorologist and climatologist. He was the son of Indologist Wilhelm Geiger and the brother of physicist Hans Geiger. He worked with Wladimir Köppen on climatology, hence the Köppen–Geiger climate classification.

References 

 Prof. Dr. Rudolf Geiger zum 70. Geburtstag. Festschrift herausgegeben von seinen Schülern. Universität München – Meteorologisches Institut. Wissenschaftliche Mitteilungen Nr. 9, 1964 (with image).
 Baumgartner, Albert/ Nachruf – Prof. Dr. Dr. h. c. Rudolf Geiger. In: Mitteilungen der Deutschen Meteorologischen Gesellschaft Jg. 33, 1981, H. 1, S. 21–24.

.

German climatologists
German meteorologists
1894 births
1981 deaths
20th-century German scientists